Son of Gutbucket is a 1969 sampler album released to promote artists on the Liberty Records label. It followed the earlier release in 1969 of Gutbucket, (subtitled An Underworld Eruption).

Track listing

Side 1
 "Bootleg" - Creedence Clearwater Revival - from the LP Bayou Country
 "My Babe She Ain't Nothing But A Doggone Crazy Fool Mumble" - Ian Anderson's Country Blues Band - from the LP Stereo Death Breakdown
 "I Got Love If You Want It" - Johnny Winter - from the LP The Progressive Blues Experiment
 "Preparation G" - T.I.M.E. - from the LP Smooth Ball
 "Walking Down Their Outlook" - High Tide - from the LP Sea Shanties
 "Oh Death" - Jo-Ann Kelly & Tony McPhee - from the LP I Asked for Water, She Gave Me Gasoline 
 "Don't Mean A Thing" - Floating Bridge - from the LP Floating Bridge
 "Sergeant Sunshine" - Roy Harper - from the LP Folkjokeopus
 "Mistreated" - The Groundhogs - from the LP Blues Obituary

Side 2
 "Sic 'Em Pigs" - Canned Heat - from the LP Hallelujah
 "Hard Headed Woman" - Andy Fernbach - from the LP If You Miss Your Connexion
 "T.B. Blues" - McKenna Mendelson Mainline - from the LP Stink
 "Sunshine Possibilities" - Famous Jug Band - from the LP Sunshine Possibilities
 "Hurry Up John" - Idle Race - from the LP Idle Race
 "I'm So Tired" - Brett Marvin and the Thunderbolts - from the LP I Asked for Water, She Gave Me Gasoline 
 "Leavin' My Home" - T.I.M.E. - from the LP Smooth Ball
 "Sugar On The Line" - Aynsley Dunbar Retaliation - from the LP To Mum - From Aynsley & The Boys

Sampler albums
1969 compilation albums
Folk compilation albums
Blues compilation albums
Rock compilation albums
Liberty Records compilation albums
Record label compilation albums